The Pride of Africa is a luxury train which is run by Rovos Rail. It is billed as the "World's Most Luxurious Train". It travels through South Africa, Zimbabwe, Zambia and Tanzania.

Rovos Rail was established in 1989.

Locations 
Following is a list of the locations of the traditional route the Pride of Africa follows. However, as of 2010 there are variations to this route, e.g. a Botswana branch.

South Africa 
Cape Town
Matjiesfontein
Kimberley
Pretoria
Hoedspruit
Beit Bridge

Zimbabwe 

Victoria Falls

Zambia 

Livingstone
Lusaka
Kanona
Kundalila Falls
Mpika
Kasama
Nkonde

Tanzania 

Tunduma
Makambako
Mlimba
Kiduna
Mzenga
Dar es Salaam

External links 
Rovos Rail Official Website
Route map 

International named passenger trains
Named passenger trains of South Africa
1989 establishments in South Africa

пр